is a passenger railway station in the city of Maebashi, Gunma Prefecture, Japan, operated by East Japan Railway Company (JR East).

Lines
Komagata Station is served by the Ryōmō Line, and is located 74.9 rail kilometers from the terminus of the line at Oyama Station.

Station layout
The station consists of one side platform and one island platform connected by a footbridge. The station has a Midori no Madoguchi ticket office.

Platforms

History
Komagata Station was opened on 20 November 1889. The station was absorbed into the JR East network upon the privatization of the Japanese National Railways (JNR) on 1 April 1987. A new elevated station building was completed in March 2011.

Passenger statistics
In fiscal 2019, the station was used by an average of 2939 passengers daily (boarding passengers only).

Surrounding area
Maebashi Kyoai Gakuen College
Maebashi-Higashi Post Office

See also
 List of railway stations in Japan

References

External links

 JR East Station information 

Railway stations in Gunma Prefecture
Ryōmō Line
Stations of East Japan Railway Company
Railway stations in Japan opened in 1889
Maebashi